John Durell Durell (21 May 1812 – 1 June 1879) was an English first-class cricketer and clergyman.

The son of Durell Durell senior, he was born at Westminster in May 1812. He was educated at Westminster School, before going up to New Inn Hall, Oxford. While studying at Oxford, he made his debut in first-class cricket for the Marylebone Cricket Club (MCC) against Oxford University in 1838 at Oxford. In the same season he played for Oxford University in The University Match against Cambridge University, with Durrell making two further first-class appearances for Oxford in 1839 and 1840, both against the MCC. He scored a total of 108 runs in his four first-class matches, with a high score of 53 for Oxford University. After graduating from Oxford, Durrell took holy orders in the Church of England. He was the perpetual curate of Marchwood from 1860–78. He died at Winchester in June 1879, a year after leaving his ecclesiastical post at Marchwood.

References

External links

1812 births
1879 deaths
People from Westminster
People educated at Westminster School, London
Alumni of New Inn Hall, Oxford
English cricketers
Marylebone Cricket Club cricketers
Oxford University cricketers
19th-century English Anglican priests